Elachista densa is a moth of the family Elachistidae. It is found in Iran and the United Arab Emirates.

References

densa
Moths described in 1981
Moths of the Middle East